Pork was an Argentine post-grunge band founded in 2002 by the Bar Rabia twins.  The band members are the Bar Rabia twins (Czar and Gaston), Nino Conde and the recent new member Max Mateo.

History
In August 2006, Pork supported American band Fear Factory
 at the Pepsi Stadium in Buenos Aires, drawing the attention of Alejandro Taranto, an executive producer for bands such as A.N.I.M.A.L. and Los Fabulosos Cadillacs.  He later had Pork signed onto TommyGun Entertainment and Universal Music Argentina to record their debut album.

The recording sessions took place between April and June 2007 at "Del Cielito Studio", which is now owned by local band Bersuit Vergarabat. The post-production and mastering was done by Eduardo Bergallo.  The album, titled "Multiple Choice", was released in May 2008. The song "Akira" was the first single, and a video involving an anime character and the band can be seen on MTV and Much Music.

In July 2008, Pork played at the Adolescent Fest sponsored by MTV.  In October 2008, Pork was selected to support American band Nine Inch Nails, playing right before the main act.

The band is currently inactive until further notice.

Members
 Cesar Bar Rabia - Vocals/AGuitar
 Ton Bar Rabia - Guitar
 Nino Conde - Bass/Guitar
 David Ortiz - Bass
 Fer Santana - Drums
 Max Mateo - (2012)
 Paulo Torres - (2002-2011)

Discography

Albums

References

External links
Pork's Official Website
Pork's Official Spanish Site
  Pork's MySpace
 Pork's Youtube Channel

Post-grunge groups
Argentine alternative rock groups